Kader is a village in Maharashtra, India. It is located in Umarga Taluka in Osmanabad district. The village resides in the Marathwada region, and falls under the supervision of the Aurangabad division. Located 81 km towards east from the district headquarters Osmanabad, the village is also 9 km from Umarga and 483 km from the state capital Mumbai.

Demographics 
The main language spoken here is Marathi. According to the 2011 Census, the total population of Kader village is 5055 and number of houses are 1023. The population of female citizens is 48% and the rate of female literacy is 29%.

Nearby villages 

 Aurad is 4 km away
 Bhusni is 5 km away
 Kantekur is 6 km away
 Kasgi is 7 km away
 Palasgaon is 8 km away

Kader is surrounded by Åland taluka towards south, Lohara taluka towards north, Nilanga taluka towards north, Basavakalyan taluka towards east.

Nearby cities 
The cities near to Kader are Umarga, Tuljapur, Nilanga, Gulbarga.

Postal details 
The postal head office for Kader is Umarga. The pin code of Kader is 413606.

Politics 
The National Congress Party (NCP), Shiv Sena, SHS and INC are the major political parties in Kader.

Polling stations near Kader 

 Grampanchayat Office Madaj
 Lokmanya Tilak Vidyalaya Kadeer Central side
 Junior College Gunjoti south side
 Lokmanya Tilak Vidyalaya Kadeer east side
 Z.P.P.S Mulaj Tanda

Education 
The colleges near Kader are:

 Shri Sharadchandraji Pawar Junior college Naichakur
 National Backward Agriculture Education Information Technology Osmanabad
 Sevagram college
 Sevagram college, Kawatha

The schools in Kader are:

 Lokmanya Tilak Vidyalaya

References 

Geography of Maharashtra